Charles Lucio Osei (born 18 July 1995) is a Ghanaian professional footballer who plays as a defender for Ghanaian Premier League side Dreams F.C. He was the captain of the side between 2016 and 2018. He was later appointed as the deputy captain of the side in November 2020, after being absent from the squad for over two seasons due to a knee injury.

Club career

Dreams FC

2016–2019 
Osei is a graduate of the Dreams FC youth team. He was promoted to the senior team in early 2016, ahead of the 2016 Ghana Premier League. He made his debut on 21 February 2016, playing the 75 minutes in a 1–0 win over Cape Coast Ebusua Dwarfs, in the process creating the goal through a corner kick in the 44th minute. He succeeded Leonard Tawiah as the captain of the side in 2016–2017. He sustained a threatening injury to his knee which kept him out of the Ghana Premier League for over three years. He underwent a knee surgery in Egypt through the sponsorship and help from former Dreams FC player John Antwi. In November 2018, he began rehabilitation in Egypt.

2020–21 season 
Ahead of the 2020–21 Ghana Premier League season, he was named on the team's senior squad list as the league was set to restart in November 2020. In November 2020, he was named as the new deputy club captain ahead of the season, along with Abdul Jalilu deputising new captain Michael Agbekpornu.

International career 
Osei received call-ups into the Ghana national under-20 football team in 2014.

References

External links 
 

Living people
1995 births
Association football defenders
Ghanaian footballers
Dreams F.C. (Ghana) players
Ghana Premier League players